Staffolo is a comune (municipality) in the Province of Ancona in the Italian region Marche, located about  southwest of Ancona.

Staffolo borders the following municipalities: Apiro, Cingoli, Cupramontana, Jesi, San Paolo di Jesi.

Among the churches in the town are:
 San Francesco
 Chiesa della Madonna della Castellaretta
 Sant'Egidio

Demographic evolution

Notable people
Alessandro Costantini, Italian organist and composer, uncle of Vincenzo Albrici and brother of
Fabio Costantini

References

Cities and towns in the Marche